At Midnight is  2023 Mexican romantic comedy film directed by Jonah Feingold from a script he co-wrote with Maria Hinojos and Giovanni M. Porta.  The film stars Monica Barbaro and Diego Boneta, who also produced.  The film was released on Paramount+ on February 10, 2023.

Premise 
Sophie Wilder is in Mexico City filming Super Society 3 and hopes to get her own spin-off. While shooting, she catches her boyfriend and co-star, Adam, cheating on her with a crew member. As Sophie struggles to figure out how she can move forward, she meets Alejandro, a junior manager at a hotel used for the production. A deep friendship develops between Sophie and Alejandro as they try to figure out how things can develop in their limited time together.

Cast 
 Diego Boneta as Alejandro
 Monica Barbaro as Sophie Wilder
 Anders Holm as Adam
 Whitney Cummings
 Catherine Cohen
 Casey Thomas Brown
 Maya Zapata
 Fernando Carsa
 Ricardo Esquerra
 Matt Ramos as a fan critic for Super Society

Production 
At Midnight was first written by Giovanni M. Porta with Diego Boneta. Jonah Feingold later signed on to direct and helped write a second draft with Maria Hinojos. Most of the film's starring cast was announced February 2022 as it began shooting in Mexico in February 2022.

The film was written with a desire to showcase the beauty of Mexico that is often overshadowed by its frequent portrayal as a desert.  The goal was to have Mexico City feel like another character in the film akin to portrayals of Paris or New York. Director Jonah Feingold credited his Mexican production crew, Diego Boneta, and cinematographer Chuy Chávez with helping him capture the aesthetic of the city.

Release 
At Midnight was released simultaneously to regions around the world on February 10, 2023, for streaming on Paramount+.

Reception 
 Writing for Variety, Courtney Howard felt that it was a formulaic romantic comedy, but she praised the performances of Boneta and Barbaro, highlighting the chemistry between the two. G. Allen Johnson of the San Francisco Chronicle praised the performances by the cast, especially Barbaro's, but called the scripted story "daffy".

References

External links 
 

2023 romantic comedy films
2020s English-language films
2020s Mexican films
English-language Mexican films
Films set in Mexico City
Films shot in Mexico
Mexican romantic comedy films
Paramount+ original films